A Christmas Carol is an 1843 novella by Charles Dickens.

A Christmas Carol, Christmas Carol, or The Christmas Carol may also refer to:
 Christmas carol, a type of song sung at Christmas

Film and television
 A Christmas Carol (1908 film), a silent film starring Thomas Ricketts
 A Christmas Carol (1910 film), a silent film starring Marc McDermott
 A Christmas Carol (1938 film), a film starring Reginald Owen
 The Christmas Carol (1949 TV special), a TV special starring Taylor Holmes
 Scrooge (1951 film), released as A Christmas Carol in the United States, a British film starring Alastair Sim
 "A Christmas Carol" (Shower of Stars), a 1954 installment of Shower of Stars
 A Christmas Carol (1960 film), a British theatrical short
 Scrooge (1970 film), a musical film starring Albert Finney
 A Christmas Carol (TV special), a 1971 animated short film starring Alastair Sim
 A Christmas Carol (1982 film), an Australian made-for-television animated film
 A Christmas Carol (1984 film), a television film starring George C. Scott
 A Christmas Carol (1997 film), an animated film
 A Christmas Carol (1999 film), a television film starring Patrick Stewart
 A Christmas Carol (2000 film), a made-for-TV film starring Ross Kemp
 Christmas Carol: The Movie, a 2001 animated film starring Kate Winslet, Nicolas Cage and Michael Gambon
 A Christmas Carol (2004 film), a musical television movie starring Kelsey Grammer
 A Christmas Carol (2006 film), an animated film
 A Christmas Carol (2009 film), a film by Robert Zemeckis and starring Jim Carrey
 A Christmas Carol (TV series), a 2019 television drama starring Guy Pearce
 "Christmas Carol" (The X-Files), a 1997 episode of The X-Files
 "A Christmas Carol" (Doctor Who), a 2010 Doctor Who Christmas special

Theatre
 A Christmas Carol (1988 play), a stage performance by Patrick Stewart
 A Christmas Carol (musical), a 1994 Alan Menken musical
 A Christmas Carol (2017 play), a play by Jack Thorne

Other uses
 "In the Bleak Midwinter" or "A Christmas Carol", a poem and carol by Christina Rossetti

See also
 Adaptations of A Christmas Carol
 Scrooge (disambiguation)